Rashied Khalid Davis (born July 24, 1979) is a retired American football wide receiver. He was originally signed by the San Jose SaberCats of the Arena Football League  as an undrafted free agent in 2002. He played college football at San Jose State. He has also played for the Chicago Bears and Detroit Lions.

Early years
Davis was born in Los Angeles, California and attended John F. Kennedy High School in Granada Hills, Los Angeles. His father was murdered when Davis was only eight years old. Davis and his eight other siblings were raised by their mother and aunt. Unlike most other football players on the team, Davis had not played organized football prior to his sophomore year in high school. He did not start a single game in high school, and spent most of the time on the bench.

He later attended West Los Angeles College, where he played football as wide receiver and defensive back for the college's team. He was the team's most productive player as a junior. He later finished his collegiate career at San Jose State. In 2004, Davis was a running backs coach at West Valley College in Saratoga, California. Davis earned his B.A. in sociology from San Jose State in 2006.

Professional career

San Jose SaberCats
Davis signed with the San Jose SaberCats of the Arena Football League (AFL) in 2002 and played as a wide receiver and cornerback. Davis missed much of the SaberCats' 2002 ArenaBowl championship season due to injury and joined the team practice squad after recovery. Davis debuted professionally in 2003 with the SaberCats. His best years came in 2004 and 2005, in which Davis emerged as one of the team's most productive players, posting a team leading 1,785 all-purpose yards. In 2005, Davis scored 44 touchdowns and 264 points as a return specialist and wide receiver. He caught 100 passes for 1,420 yards and 30 touchdowns, which was a franchise record, and also scored eight rushing touchdowns. Davis's feats earned him recognition as the team's most valuable player and offensive player of the year.

First stint with Bears
Despite his success in the AFL, Davis ventured into the National Football League in hopes of finding a new career. He tried out for the San Francisco 49ers, but failed to make the team. The Oakland Raiders planned to offer Davis a contract, but later retracted their offer. The Chicago Bears finally signed Davis to a contract in 2005. He initially started his career as a cornerback, but was converted into a wide receiver with two interceptions before the 2006 season.

Davis had to work very hard to adapt to the rigors of being an NFL wide receiver. Rex Grossman, then the team's starting quarterback, claimed Davis was one of the team's hardest workers in the 2006 offseason. Despite being overshadowed by more experienced wide receivers like Muhsin Muhammad, Bernard Berrian, and Mark Bradley, he proceeded to stun critics and skeptics by emerging as one of the Bears' most productive assets in the 2006 preseason, including a 100-yard touchdown return on August 18, 2006. His preseason success earned him a spot on the Bears' starting roster, making him one of the three receivers in a regular three wide receiver set.

During the 2006 season, Davis amassed 303 yards for two touchdowns on 22 receptions. He made many clutch receptions during the season; catching a game-winning touchdown against the Minnesota Vikings during week three, and later an overtime reception that set up a game-winning field goal in week fourteen against the Tampa Bay Buccaneers. Arguably, his most important catch came in the Divisional Round of the 2006 playoffs, when he caught another overtime pass that set up the game's winning field goal, allowing the Bears to advance to the NFC Championship. After the Bears won the NFC Championship over the New Orleans Saints, Davis caught one pass for 2 yards and returned one kick for 15 yards in Super Bowl XLI. Davis only caught 17 passes during the 2007 season, and primarily played on the Bears special teams unit.

A restricted free agent in the 2008 offseason, Davis signed his one-year, $1,927,000 tender offer on April 18. Davis caught a career-high 35 passes, for 445 yards and 2 touchdowns. At one point during the 2008 season, the Bears were prepared to use Davis as a reserve cornerback due to several injuries in their secondary. During the 2009 preseason, Davis was locked in fierce competition with Devin Aromashodu and Brandon Rideau for a spot on the team's final 53-man roster. Despite only catching three passes during the entire preseason, Davis, a key special teams contributor, beat out Rideau for the final wide receiver spot. Davis only recorded five receptions during the entire 2009 season, and spent most of his time on special teams.
Davis continued to be a regular member of the Bears special teams in 2010. He finished the 2010 season with nine receptions, for 84 yards and one touchdown.

Detroit Lions
On July 29, 2011, Davis signed with the Detroit Lions, where he was expected to see most of his playing time on special teams while also adding depth at the wide receiver position.

During a 2011 game against the Green Bay Packers on Thanksgiving, Davis filled in at cornerback, as the Lions had suffered a rash of injuries in the secondary.  It was the first time he had played the position since 2005, as a player for the Bears.  He finished the game with two tackles.  Davis finished the 2011 season with four receptions, seven tackles, and two kick returns.

Chicago Bears (second stint)
On August 6, 2012, Davis signed a one-year contract with the Bears after Devin Thomas retired. On August 29, Davis was waived by the team.

Second stint with SaberCats
On July 25, 2013, Davis was assigned to the SaberCats. In the SaberCats' final regular season game on July 27, a 65–40 win over the Chicago Rush, Davis returned one kick for 17 yards. On July 29, the SaberCats placed Davis on injured reserve.

Personal life
He has a wife named Dianna, a daughter named Alanna Lilly, and a son named Eli Rashied. Rashied Davis also worked at a Best Buy in San Jose while playing for the SaberCats.

After retiring from professional football, Davis joined his former teammate Jason McKie to coach football at Carmel Catholic High School. Davis also operates Saturday Place, a charity and community outreach program, that assists public school students in Chicago.

See also

 List of Arena Football League and National Football League players

References

External links
San Jose SaberCats bio
 Chicago Bears bio
 Stats at ArenaFan
 

1979 births
Living people
American football cornerbacks
American football return specialists
American football wide receivers
Chicago Bears players
Detroit Lions players
Junior college football coaches in the United States
West Valley Vikings football coaches
Players of American football from Los Angeles
San Jose SaberCats players
San Jose State Spartans football players
West Los Angeles Wildcats football players